Martina Marie Franko (born January 13, 1976) is a Canadian soccer defender who played for Vancouver Whitecaps.

Career
Franko performs a versatile role, and can play as either a midfielder or forward. She has been a regular on Surrey United women's premier division team playing in the British Columbia-based Metro Women's Soccer League for the past two years. The MWSL plays in the winter so no major conflict with summer leagues such as W-League.

In her club career, Franko has won two W-League titles with the Vancouver Whitecaps, in 2004 and 2006. After one year for Los Angeles Sol in the Women's Professional Soccer League turned on April 1, 2010 back to her former club Vancouver Whitecaps.

International career
Franko won her first cap for Canada in 2005, aged 29. She scored her first goal on her second cap, against Germany, in a 4–3 loss. At the 2007 Pan American Games, she helped the team achieve a bronze medal in the soccer competition; later that year, she played in her first major, FIFA affiliated tournament with the Canada team, the 2007 World Cup, where she played all three group stage matches, scoring one goal, before the team was knocked out. She also competed for the team at the 2008 Summer Olympics.

Personal life
She moved to Squamish, British Columbia, home of her husband John, in 2003.

Her parents, Dana Holanová and Jaromír Holan, were the Czechoslovak national champions in ice dancing in the 1960s.

Coaching career
In January 2008, Franko joined Quest University Canada as head coach of the varsity women's soccer team.

Franko, also a Canadian National B licensed coach, served as an assistant coach for the Tigers during the 1998 season after receiving her bachelor's degree in psychology.

Honours 
 2022: Canada Soccer Hall of Fame

References

External links
 Official site
 
 / Canada Soccer Hall of Fame
 
 
 
 

1976 births
Living people
Sportspeople from Cincinnati
Soccer players from Ohio
Colorado College Tigers women's soccer players
Naturalized citizens of Canada
Canadian people of Czech descent
Canadian women's soccer players
Canada women's international soccer players
Women's association football midfielders
Women's association football forwards
Vancouver Whitecaps FC (women) players
Footballers at the 2008 Summer Olympics
Olympic soccer players of Canada
Los Angeles Sol players
Pan American Games competitors for Canada
USL W-League (1995–2015) players
California Storm players
Women's Premier Soccer League players
2007 FIFA Women's World Cup players
Footballers at the 2007 Pan American Games
College women's soccer coaches in the United States
Women's Professional Soccer players
Pan American Games bronze medalists for Canada
Medalists at the 2007 Pan American Games
Pan American Games medalists in football